São José do Rio Preto–Prof. Eribelto Manoel Reino State Airport  is the airport serving São José do Rio Preto, Brazil. It is named after the local lawyer, accountant, economist and politician Eribelto Manoel Reino (1941–1987).

It is operated by ASP.

History
On July 15, 2021, the concession of the airport was auctioned to the Consorcium Aeroportos Paulista (ASP), comprised by companies Socicam and Dix. The airport was previously operated by DAESP.

Airlines and destinations

Access

See also

List of airports in Brazil

References

External links

Airports in São Paulo (state)
São José do Rio Preto